This is a list of Spanish television related events in 2021.

Events 
 March 21 – Telecinco broadcasts documentary Rocío, contar la verdad para seguir viva unleashing reactions from politicians as  Irene Montero, Ministry in the Spanish Government, Íñigo Errejón or Rocío Monasterio.
 May 26 - RTVE organization chart is renewed.
 July 8 - The Assembly of Madrid changes by Law the organization chart of Telemadrid.

Debuts

Television shows

Ending this year

Changes of network affiliation

Deaths 
 January 7 - Alfonso Eduardo Pérez Orozco, presenter, 80.
 March 1 - Enrique San Francisco, actor, 65.
 March 3 - Àlex Casademunt, Singer, actor and presenter, 39.
 March 17 - Antón García Abril, composer, 87.
 April 24 - Hugo Stuven, director, 80.
 April 28 - Juan Joya El Risitas, comedian, 65.
 June 23 - Mila Ximénez, pundit, 69.
 July 3 - Carmen Bernardos, actress, 91.
 July 5 - Tico Medina, presenter, 86.
 July 17 - Pilar Bardem, actress, 82.
 July 22 - Ana María Ventura, actress, 98.
 July 29 - Carmelo Martínez, Singer, 64.
 August 20 - Matilde Vilariño, voice actress, 100.
 August 26 - Juana Ginzo, voice actress, 99.
 September 8 - Jordi Rebellón, actor, 64.
 September 29 - Antonio Gasset, presenter, 75.
 November 12 - Ágata Lys, actress, 67.
 December 13 - Verónica Forqué, actress, 66.

See also
2021 in Spain
List of Spanish films of 2021

References 

2021 in Spanish television